Penny Fellows Lumley (born 1963), is a world real tennis singles and doubles champion and regarded as one of "the greatest female players in the history of tennis."

Early life
Born Penny Bland, Lumley first played lawn tennis prior to taking up real tennis in 1985.  Just  4 years later, she was the World Champion, beating British journalist and three-time World Champion Sally Jones in 1989 in Philadelphia.

Career
Lumley secured a streak of impressive victories between 1989 and 2004, including securing 6 out of 8 World Championship titles (singles) (1989, 1991, 1995, 1997, 1999, 2003).  In that same period she played in every World Championship doubles final, winning 6 times (1993, 1995, 1997, 1999, 2001 and 2003) with various partners including Evelyn David, Jo Wood Iddles, Sue Haswell and Fiona Deuchar. She won the doubles title in the 2007 World Championships in Manchester with her partner Charlotte Cornwallis.

She dominated the LRTA International tournament from its inception in 1998 through the next 3 tournaments.  Penny was the British Open singles champion 12 times between 1989 and 2004, including an unbeaten run of 8 victories from 1995 to 2002. She won the doubles title 10 times between 1991 and 2008. She was also successful abroad, winning the US Open (both singles and doubles) 6 times, the French Open singles 7 times and the doubles 10 times, and the Australian Open singles 3 times.  In 1996–97 she won the Grand Slam, taking the British, French, American and Australian Opens as well as the World singles and doubles titles.

Lumley continues to compete today. In 2014, she won the US Open Singles Title together with the US Open Doubles title with her daughter Tara. She won the French Open Singles in 2015. Lumley also recently retained the Ladies’ Masters Singles title.

Awards
Lumley was the first female recipient of the Baerlein Cup bestowed by the Tennis and Rackets Association for the best tennis performance by an amateur. She was also the first woman to receive the Greenwood Trophy in 1989 for the most improved tennis player of the year.  
In 1999, her achievements in tennis and her 7 French Open singles titles were acknowledged with a Medal of the French Republic.
In 2000 she won the Unsung Hero/Heroine category and the overall Grand Prix Prize at the Best of British Awards for Great Sporting Achievement.

She was inducted as a Member of the Most Excellent Order of the British Empire, “M.B.E.” in 2004.
In 2011 Penny was inducted into the International Hall of Fame of the US Court Tennis Association, only the second lady ever to receive this award. The award ceremony was held at the Racquet and Tennis Club.

Personal life
Lumley has two children, Tara  and John who are also real tennis players. She is a Founder Honorary Life Member of Prested Hall. Hobbies include running.

References

1963 births
English real tennis players
Living people
English sportswomen